Connecticut General Life Insurance Company v. Johnson, 303 U.S. 77 (1938), is a case in which the Supreme Court of the United States dealt with corporate entities. The case involved whether California could levy a tax on a company licensed to do business in that state for transactions that occurred in a different state.

Judgment
Justice Stone delivered the opinion of the Court.  Justice Hugo Black dissented.

See also
Corporate personhood
List of United States Supreme Court cases, volume 303
Santa Clara County v. Southern Pacific Railroad

External links

United States Supreme Court cases of the Hughes Court
United States corporate case law
United States due process case law
1938 in United States case law
United States Supreme Court cases